Masti (English translation: Fun) is a 2004 Indian Hindi-language crime comedy film directed by Indra Kumar, starring Ajay Devgn, Vivek Oberoi, Riteish Deshmukh Aftab Shivdasani, Lara Dutta, Amrita Rao, Tara Sharma and Genelia D'Souza. The film released in 2004, and received positive response from critics, and also managed to do well at the box office. The film spawned two sequels, Grand Masti (2013) and Great Grand Masti (2016).

Plot

Masti revolves around three bachelors, Meet, Prem and Amar. Their lives are carefree until they each get married and turn into bitter, unsatisfied husbands. Meet marries Anchal who is obsessively possessive about her husband. Prem marries Geeta who is overly religious and thus their sex life suffers. Amar marries Bindiya who is dominating and they live with her equally aggressive mother. Fed up, the men get together one day and make plans to reintroduce the fun and excitement back into their lives. They set their sights on other women but eventually realize they have all been seeing the same girl, Monica. She blackmails the trio, threatening to expose the affairs to their wives unless they give her Rs. 10 lakhs.

Having gathered the money, the terrified men arrive at the drop off location, only to find Monica dead in her car. They panic and try to hide her body, in order to avoid blame, but are interrupted by police officer Sikander, who is suspicious of them. The trio goes to Monica's house for further investigation, and they hide in Monica's veranda after they realise that Sikander had followed them there. The next morning, a mysterious man finds them and reveals that he killed Monica, demanding a ransom to cover the crime. The guilt-ridden men go to their respective wives to apologise, since they feel like the truth is bound to be revealed. The very next day, the killer pursues the men, resulting in a shoot out in which they unintentionally kill the mysterious man. Afterwards, they are arrested and imprisoned. Their wives arrive at the jail and the men emotionally reveal the truth. After some time, the women reveal that the entire situation was set up by them – Monica is alive and the 'killer' is Sikander himself, who is actually Bindiya's cousin. The women wanted to teach their husband's a lesson and remind them to be appreciative. The men then apologize to their wives and promise to never do "masti" again.

Cast
 Ajay Devgn as Inspector Sikander Tyagi
 Lara Dutta as Monica Singh
 Riteish Deshmukh as Amar Saxena
 Vivek Oberoi as Meet Mehta
 Aftab Shivdasani as Prem Chawla
 Amrita Rao as Anchal Mehta
 Tara Sharma as Geeta Chawla
 Genelia D'Souza as Bindiya Saxena
 Satish Shah as Dr. Suresh Kapadia
 Archana Puran Singh as Bindiya's mom
 Rakhi Sawant as Ms. Neha Saxena
 Suresh Menon as Prem's co-worker
 Murali Sharma as a Eunuch at band stand
 Divya Palat
 Aastha Gill
 Dinesh Lamba
 Shahbaz Khan as Vinayak Bapat

Soundtrack
The soundtrack of the movie was composed by Anand Raj Anand and the lyrics were penned by Sameer. According to the Indian trade website Box Office India, with around 10,00,000 units sold, this film's soundtrack album was the year's fifteenth highest-selling.

Reception

Box office
It did very well at the box office, earning around  worldwide and was declared a Hit by Box Office India.

Critical response
Taran Adarsh of IndiaFM gave the film 3.5 stars out of 5, writing ″On the whole, MASTI has all it takes to appeal to the cinegoers - an impressive star cast, popular music, dollops of comedy and most importantly, sex - not in visuals, but in dialogues and gestures. All these factors combined together will prove advantageous for the film and should take it to the winning post.″ Priya Ganapati of Rediff.com wrote ″If you like a little spice in your jokes, don't mind gags on homosexuality and are in the mood for some 'non-vegetarian' stuff, then go for it. Masti is guaranteed to give you a few laughs and good 'timepass'.″ Manish Gajjar of BBC.com wrote ″On the whole, Masti has all the right ingredients to click at the box office. With a great star cast, excellent music and lots of comedy, Masti is a great film to watch this Easter holidays at a cinema near you.″

Sequels
A sequel named Grand Masti was released 9 years later on 13 September 2013. Another sequel Great Grand Masti was released on 15 July 2016.

References

External links
 

2000s Hindi-language films
2000s buddy comedy films
2000s sex comedy films
2000s crime comedy films
2004 films
Films directed by Indra Kumar
Films scored by Anand Raj Anand
Indian buddy comedy films
Indian sex comedy films
Indian crime comedy films
2004 comedy films